Naresh Katra is a MLA and State Tribal Area Development Minister  in  Government of Rajasthan led by Vasundhara Raje of Bharatiya Janata Party. He was minister of tribal area development. He was elected to Rajasthan Legislative Assembly from Pratapgarh district of  Rajasthan. He is a former member of Parliamant Lok Sabha and represented Salumbar. He was born on 25 January 1946 and studied for BA and LLB. He resides in his village Ambamata near a distance of 5 k.m. form Pratapgarh District Headquarter.

References 

1946 births
Living people
Rajasthan MLAs 2013–2018
People from Pratapgarh district, Rajasthan
State cabinet ministers of Rajasthan
India MPs 1989–1991
Lok Sabha members from Rajasthan
Bharatiya Janata Party politicians from Rajasthan
People from Udaipur district